Dragovac (Serbian Cyrillic: Драговац) is a village in the municipality of Požarevac, Serbia. According to the 2002 census, the village has a population of 910 people.

References

Populated places in Braničevo District